Botnedalsvatn is a lake in Tokke Municipality in Vestfold og Telemark county, Norway. Botnedalsvatn has a dam on the southeast end of the lake which regulates the surface elevation of the lake. The lake is used as a reservoir for the nearby Byrte Hydroelectric Power Station. Water flows from this lake through a tunnel into the power plant which is located at the southern end of the nearby lake Byrtevatn.

See also
List of lakes in Norway

References

Tokke
Reservoirs in Norway
Lakes of Vestfold og Telemark